Hawera was a parliamentary electorate in the South Taranaki District of New Zealand from 1896 to 1908. It was represented by two Members of Parliament over the four parliamentary terms of its existence.

Population centres
In the 1896 electoral redistribution, rapid population growth in the North Island required the transfer of three seats from the South Island to the north. Four electorates that previously existed were re-established, and three electorates were established for the first time, including Hawera. The  electorate was abolished, the  electorate shifted north, and the  electorate shifted east. Settlements in the original Hawera electorate were the towns of Hāwera, Manaia, and Eltham.

In the 1902 electoral redistribution, Eltham was lost to the Patea electorate, but Ōpunake was gained from the Taranaki electorate. In the 1907 electoral redistribution, the Hawera electorate was abolished, and its area was distributed to the Patea and Egmont electorates.

History
Felix McGuire was the electorate's first representative. As an independent conservative, he had previously represented the Egmont electorate since a 1891 by-election after the resignation of Harry Atkinson. McGuire and Major once again contested the Hawera electorate in 1905, and Major remained successful.

Major stood in the Patea electorate, but was defeated by the conservative politician George Pearce.

Members of Parliament
The Hawera electorate was represented by two Members of Parliament:

Key

Election results

1905 election

1902 election

1899 election

1896 election

Notes

References

Historical electorates of New Zealand
South Taranaki District
1896 establishments in New Zealand
1908 disestablishments in New Zealand
Hāwera
Politics of Taranaki